I Love to Eat was a live television series on NBC that aired from August 30, 1946 to May 18, 1947, and was a cooking show hosted by chef and cookbook author James Beard. The show is notable for having been the first network television cooking show.

Schedule 
When the show started, each episode was 15 minutes long and presented at 8:30 p.m. EST on Fridays, immediately before The World in Your Home at 8:45 p.m. However, this was later changed to 30 minutes (April–May 1947) as more complicated recipes were demonstrated and prepared.

Format
The Borden-sponsored program opened with a sketch of Elsie, the famed Borden cow. Then Beard, appearing behind a kitchen counter, took over to demonstrate the preparation of some of his unique dishes for the live television audience.

Personnel
The program also featured Elsie de Wolfe, who was described as a "Manhattan socialite". The producer was Patricia Kennedy.

Episode status 
No footage from the show remains, since methods to record live television such as kinescopes were not invented until 1947. However, an audio recording of one episode survives. As documented in the Library of Congress archives, the audio recordings of episodes from I Love to Eat (as recorded from live TV broadcasts over WNBT-TV in NY in 1946-47) include a 1947 episode featuring a ski report and ski luncheon discussions by Beard. This is followed by prolonged live commercials from Borden, including Elsie the Cow as show sponsor, while Beard recounts his dream about Elsie as part of the show.

It was the successor to the Radio City Matinee (May 1946) program, which featured fashion, culture, art and cooking segments (including chefs George Rector and James Beard) and For You and Yours (successor show starting in June 1946, also featuring Beard in the kitchen), all on WNBT-TV in New York.  Some cooking demonstration programs had preceded it on local TV pre-war broadcasts of 1939–1941.

See also
1946-47 United States network television schedule

References

External links
 
 

1946 American television series debuts
1947 American television series endings
American live television series
NBC original programming
1940s American cooking television series
Black-and-white American television shows
English-language television shows
Lost television shows